In Greek mythology, the Rod of Asclepius (⚕; , , sometimes also spelled Asklepios), also known as the Staff of Aesculapius  and as the asklepian, is a serpent-entwined rod wielded by the Greek god Asclepius, a deity associated with healing and medicine. In modern times, it is the predominant symbol for medicine and health care, although it is sometimes confused with the similar caduceus, which has two snakes.

Greek mythology and Greek society

The Rod of Asclepius takes its name from the Greek god Asclepius, a deity associated with healing and medicinal arts in ancient Greek religion and mythology. Asclepius' attributes, the snake and the staff, sometimes depicted separately in antiquity, are combined in this symbol.

The most famous temple of Asclepius was at Epidaurus in north-eastern Peloponnese. Another famous healing temple (or asclepeion) was located on the island of Kos, where Hippocrates, the legendary "father of medicine", may have begun his career. Other asclepieia were situated in Trikala, Gortys (Arcadia), and Pergamum in Asia.

In honor of Asclepius, a particular type of non-venomous snake was often used in healing rituals, and these snakes – the Aesculapian snakes – crawled around freely on the floor in dormitories where the sick and injured slept. These snakes were introduced at the founding of each new temple of Asclepius throughout the classical world. From about 300 BCE onwards, the cult of Asclepius grew very popular and pilgrims flocked to his healing temples (Asclepieia) to be cured of their ills. Ritual purification would be followed by offerings or sacrifices to the god (according to means), and the supplicant would then spend the night in the holiest part of the sanctuary – the abaton (or adyton). Any dreams or visions would be reported to a priest who would prescribe the appropriate therapy by a process of interpretation. Some healing temples also used sacred dogs to lick the wounds of sick petitioners.

The original Hippocratic Oath began with the invocation "I swear by Apollo the Healer and by Asclepius and by Hygieia and Panacea and by all the gods ..."

The serpent and the staff appear to have been separate symbols that were combined at some point in the development of the Asclepian cult. The significance of the serpent has been interpreted in many ways; sometimes the shedding of skin and renewal is emphasized as symbolizing rejuvenation, while other assessments center on the serpent as a symbol that unites and expresses the dual nature of the work of the Apothecary Physician, who deals with life and death, sickness and health. The ambiguity of the serpent as a symbol, and the contradictions it is thought to represent, reflect the ambiguity of the use of drugs, which can help or harm, as reflected in the meaning of the term pharmakon, which meant "drug", "medicine", and "poison" in ancient Greek. However the word may become less ambiguous when "medicine" is understood as something that heals the one taking it because it poisons that which afflicts it, meaning medicine is designed to kill or drive away something and any healing happens as a result of that thing being gone, not as a direct effect of "medicine". Products deriving from the bodies of snakes were known to have medicinal properties in ancient times, and in ancient Greece, at least some were aware that snake venom that might be fatal if it entered the bloodstream could often be imbibed. Snake venom appears to have been 'prescribed' in some cases as a form of therapy.

The staff has also been variously interpreted. One view is that it, like the serpent, "conveyed notions of resurrection and healing", while another (not necessarily incompatible) is that the staff was a walking stick associated with itinerant physicians. Cornutus, a Greek philosopher probably active in the first century CE, in the Theologiae Graecae Compendium (Ch. 33) offers a view of the significance of both snake and staff:

In any case, the two symbols certainly merged in antiquity as representations of the snake coiled about the staff are common. It has been claimed that the snake wrapped around the staff was a species of rat snake, Elaphe longissima, the Aesculapian snake.

Theories

Some commentators have interpreted the symbol as a direct representation of traditional treatment of dracunculiasis, the Guinea worm disease. The worm emerges from painful ulcerous blisters. The blisters burn, causing the patient to immerse the affected area in water to cool and soothe it. The worm senses the temperature change and discharges its larvae into the water. The traditional treatment is to slowly pull the worm out of the wound over a period of hours to weeks and wind it around a stick. The modern treatment may replace the stick with a piece of sterile gauze, but is otherwise largely identical.

In the biblical Book of Numbers and Books of Kings, the nehushtan (Hebrew:  nəḥuštān or ) was a brass or bronze serpent on a pole that God told Moses to erect, saying that anyone who saw it would be protected from dying from the bites of the "fiery serpents" that God had sent to punish them for speaking against him and Moses.

Confusion with the caduceus

Unicode

A symbol  for the rod of Asclepius has a code point in the Miscellaneous Symbols table of the Unicode Standard.

Modern use

A number of organizations and services use the rod of Asclepius as their logo, or part of their logo.  These include:

Asia

Africa 
 Kenya Medical Research Institute
 Kenya Medical Training College
 Nigerian Medical Association
 South African Medical Research Council former coat of arms
 South African Military Health Service

South Pacific 
 Australian Medical Association
 Australian Medical Students' Association
 Medical Council of New Zealand
 Royal New Zealand Army Medical Corps
 Royal Australian Army Medical Corps

Canada
 Canadian Dental Association
 Canadian Medical Association
 Medical Council of Canada
 Royal Canadian Medical Service
 Ottawa Paramedic Service

Europe

United States

Worldwide
 Aerospace Medical Association
 Medical Protection Society
 Star of Life, symbol of emergency medical services
 World Health Organization

Variation
In Russia, the emblem of Main Directorate for Drugs Control features a variation with a sword and a snake on the shield.

See also

References

External links 
 

Asclepius
Heraldic charges
Medical symbols
Royal Army Medical Corps
Snakes in art
Symbols
Walking sticks
Mythological objects

no:Asklepios#Asklepiosstaven